Uerikondjera Kasaona (born 13 May 1987) is a Namibian former footballer who played as a defender and the current manager of the Namibia women's national team.

Club career
Kasaona played for 21 Brigade United.

International career
Kasaona captained Namibia at the 2014 African Women's Championship.

References

1987 births
Living people
Namibian women's footballers
Namibia women's international footballers
Women's association football defenders
Namibian football managers
Women's association football managers
Female association football managers